Kettle of Fish is a 2006 American romantic comedy film written and directed by Claudia Myers and starring Matthew Modine and Gina Gershon.

Plot
Mel is a saxophonist in his forties who lives alone with a goldfish named Daphne and has not yet decided what to do with his life. After several adventures that usually end in one night, he decides that the Swedish Inga is for him and goes to live with her deciding to sublet her apartment for a month to Ginger, a slightly neurotic English biologist, who studies the love behavior of women. frogs. During a wedding engagement, Mel meets his bride, Diana, a beautiful woman, who is marrying to a yogurt magnate, and is deeply drawn to her.

The story with Inga soon reveals itself as all the others and Mel returns to her house where she has to negotiate with Ginger for the use of the apartment. Meanwhile, he sets out on the trail of the beautiful Diana, who he cannot forget thinking she is the woman of his dreams. After finally finding her, he begins to neglect his job as a player by being hired as an elevator attendant in the condominium where Diana lives, much neglected by her husband.

But even this time, he realizes that the story cannot go on, being deeply in love with Ginger. A deep sympathy arises between the two also because of Ginger's experiments involving Mel and her goldfish.

Cast
Matthew Modine as Mel
Gina Gershon as Ginger
Christy Scott Cashman as Diana
Isiah Whitlock Jr. as Freddie
Kevin J. O'Connor as Harry
Lois Chiles as Jean
Stephen Mailer as Band Leader
Ewa Da Cruz as Inga
Fisher Stevens as Bruce
Eddie Kaye Thomas as Sean

Music 
The film's original jazz songs were composed by and performed on the tenor saxophone by Ryan Shore.

Ryan Shore performs the saxophone solos which were mimed on camera by Matthew Modine.

Reception
The film has an 18% rating on Rotten Tomatoes.

References

External links
 
 
 

American romantic comedy films
2006 romantic comedy films
2006 films
2000s English-language films
2000s American films